Carlsbad is a coastal city in the North County region of San Diego County, California, United States. As of the 2020 census, the population of the city was 114,746. Carlsbad is a popular tourist destination and home to many businesses in the golf industry.

History

Carlsbad's history began with the Luiseño people (the Spanish name given to them because of their proximity to Mission San Luis Rey), as well as some Kumeyaay in the La Costa area. Nearly every reliable fresh water creek had at least one native village, including one called Palamai.  The site is located just south of today's Buena Vista Lagoon.

The first European land exploration of Alta California, the Spanish Portolá expedition of 1769, met native villagers while camped on Buena Vista Creek. Another Luiseño villages within today's city of Carlsbad was a village at the mouth of the San Marcos Creek that the Kumeyaay called 'Ajopunquile'. A Kumeyaay village that was visited by Portolá was Hakutl, in the Rancho Ponderosa area.

During the Mexican period, in 1842, the southern portion of Carlsbad was granted as Rancho Agua Hedionda to Juan María Marrón.

In the 1880s a former sailor named John A. Frazier dug a well in the area. He began offering his water at the train station and soon the whistle-stop became known as Frazier's Station. A test done on a second fresh-water well discovered the water to be chemically similar to that found in some of the most renowned spas in the world, and the town was named after the famed spa in the Bohemian town of Karlsbad (now Karlovy Vary, Czech Republic).

To take advantage of the find, the Carlsbad Land and Mineral Water Company was formed by a German-born merchant from the Midwest named Gerhard Schutte together with Samuel Church Smith, D. D. Wadsworth and Henry Nelson. The naming of the town followed soon after, along with a major marketing campaign to attract visitors. The area experienced a period of growth, with homes and businesses sprouting up in the 1880s. Agricultural development of citrus fruits, avocados and olives soon changed the landscape. By the end of 1887, land prices fell throughout San Diego County. However, the community survived on the back of its fertile agricultural lands.

The site of John Frazier's original well can still be found at Alt Karlsbad, a replica of a German Hanseatic house, located on Carlsbad Boulevard.

In 1952, Carlsbad was incorporated to avoid annexation by its neighbor, Oceanside.

The single-runway Palomar Airport opened in 1959 after County of San Diego officials decided to replace the Del Mar Airport.  The airport was annexed to the City of Carlsbad in 1978 and renamed McClellan-Palomar Airport in 1982 after a local civic leader, Gerald McClellan.

The first modern skateboard park, Carlsbad Skatepark, was built in March 1976. It was located on the grounds of Carlsbad Raceway and was designed and built by inventors Jack Graham and John O'Malley.  The skatepark was closed in 1979, leaving Del Mar Skate Ranch, approximately 20 minutes away, as the nearest skatepark for residents such as Tony Hawk.  The site of the original Carlsbad Skatepark and Carlsbad Raceway was demolished in 2005 and is now an industrial park. However, two skateparks have since been developed.

In March 1999, Legoland California was opened. It was the first Legoland theme park outside of Europe and is currently operated by Merlin Entertainments. Merlin Entertainments owns 70 percent of the shares, and the remaining 30 percent is owned by the  LEGO group and Kirkbi A/S.

Carlsbad is home to the nation's largest desalination plant. Construction of the Carlsbad Desalination Plant at the Encina Power Station was completed in December 2015. The Encina Power Station is currently being demolished, despite efforts to preserve it as a historical landmark.

Geography

The northern area of the city is part of a tri-city area consisting of northern Carlsbad, southern Oceanside and western Vista.

The ocean-side cliffs fronting wide white-sand beaches and mild climate attract vacationers year-round.

Types of Households in Carlsbad city, California in 2015–2019. 56.6% was Married-couple households, 5.1% was cohabiting couple households, 13.6% male householder no spouse, 24.7% female householder no spouse.

Climate
Carlsbad has a semi-arid Mediterranean climate (Koppen classification BSh) and averages 263 sunny days per year. Winters are mild with periodic rain. Frost is rare along the coast, but sometimes occurs in inland valleys in December and January. Summer is almost rain free, but overcast and cool with fog off the Pacific. While most days have mild and pleasant temperatures, hot dry Santa Ana winds bring high temperatures on a few days each year, mostly in the fall.

Neighborhoods

For city planning and growth management purposes, Carlsbad is divided into four distinct quadrants.

Northwest quadrant
The northwest quadrant of Carlsbad (ZIP code 92008) includes the downtown "Village", "The Barrio", and "Olde Carlsbad." It was the first part of Carlsbad to be settled. Homes range from 1950s cottages and bungalows, 1960s ranch style houses, to elegant mansions on hills overlooking the ocean. It is also home to Hosp Grove Park, a grove of eucalyptus trees relatively untouched by development and now designated by the city for recreational use, in addition to the Buena Vista and Agua Hedionda Lagoons. It is located west of El Camino Real and north of Palomar Airport Road.

"The Barrio" area is near downtown Carlsbad bordered by Carlsbad Village Drive to the north, Tamarack Avenue to the south, Interstate 5 to the east and the railroad tracks to the west. It was settled by Latinos in the early 20th century. It is the site of the Centro de Aprendizaje, a Spanish division of the Carlsbad City Library.

Northeast quadrant
This quadrant (ZIP code 92010) is located east of El Camino Real and north of Palomar Airport Road and consists mostly of single-family homes, with larger lots found in the older area known as Chestnut Hills and the newer developments around Calavera Hills.

The Northeast quadrant also contains the Lake Calavera Nature Preserve, a 110-acre space containing a 513-foot extinct volcano known as Mount Calavera. The preserve — notable for its small lake, wide dam, and mountain — was officially set aside in the 1990s as the surrounding land was being developed. The preserve is bordered on three sides by suburban single-family homes, and on one side by small farms and rural compounds. In 2012, Sage Creek High School was developed in the southwest corner of the preserve amid some controversy. Nature experts challenged the decision to construct the school on the preserve, but Carlsbad High School was reaching its capacity and there were few undeveloped areas that had sufficient space for an additional high school. Despite missing one of its original corners, the preserve still offers miles of hiking trails with ocean views.

Southeast quadrant
The southeast quadrant (ZIP code 92009) is located east of El Camino Real and south of Palomar Airport Road and features several newer expensive master-planned communities set among hillsides, golf courses, Alga Norte Community Park and permanent open spaces. It includes Bressi Ranch and the La Costa neighborhoods of Rancho La Costa, La Costa Ridge, La Costa Oaks, La Costa Greens, La Costa Valley, and Rancho Carillo. In 1965, La Costa gave its name to the Gold Medal Golf Resort, La Costa Resort and Spa, now known as the Omni La Costa Resort and Spa. Residents here are served by the Carlsbad Unified School District, San Marcos Unified School District and the Encinitas Union School District.

Southwest quadrant
This quadrant (ZIP code 92011) extends along the Pacific Ocean to the south of the center of Carlsbad. It includes the Aviara neighborhood, which is home to the Park Hyatt Aviara Resort. It is located west of El Camino Real and south of Palomar Airport Road.

Demographics

Carlsbad is part of the San Diego-Chula Vista-Carlsbad, CA Metropolitan Statistical Area.

2010
As of the 2010 United States Census Carlsbad had a population of 105,328. The racial makeup of Carlsbad was 87,205 (82.8%) White, 1,379 (1.3%) African American, 514 (0.5%) Native American, 7,460 (7.1%) Asian, 198 (0.2%) Pacific Islander, 4,189 (4.0%) from other races, and 4,383 (4.2%) from two or more races. Hispanic or Latino of any race were 13,988 persons (13.3%).

The Census reported that 104,413 people (99.1% of the population) lived in households, 459 (0.4%) lived in non-institutionalized group quarters, and 456 (0.4%) were institutionalized.

Out of 39,964 households in 2011, there were 26,992 (67.5%) families, of which 12,345 (30.9%) had children under the age of 18 living in them, 21,705 (54.3%) were married-couple families, 1,489 (3.7%) had a male householder with no wife present, and 3,798 (9.5%) had a female householder with no husband present.  There were 12,972 (32.5%) nonfamily households, of which 10,198 (25.5%) were made up of a householder living alone and 3,299 (8.3%) were a householder living alone who was 65 years or over.  The average household size was 2.55 and the average family size was 3.10.

The population was spread out, with 25,366 people (24.1%) under the age of 18, 6,718 people (6.4%) aged 18 to 24, 28,073 people (26.7%) aged 25 to 44, 30,373 people (28.8%) aged 45 to 64, and 14,798 people (14.0%) who were 65 years of age or older. The median age was 40.4 years. For every 100 females, there were 95.6 males. For every 100 females age 18 and over, there were 92.5 males.

The homeowner vacancy rate was 1.4%; the rental vacancy rate was 4.6%. 69,855 people (66.3% of the population) lived in owner-occupied housing units and 34,558 people (32.8%) lived in rental housing units.

In 2011, the median household income was US$85,743 and the median family income was US$102,254, with 11.9% of households and 14.9% of families earning US$200,000 or more. Males had a median income of US$80,590 versus US$54,159 for females. The per capita income for the city was US$42,712. About 6.8% of families and 8.4% of the population reported income below the poverty line, including 10.1% of those under age 18 and 3.5% of those age 65 or over.

Of the population 25 years and over, 95.7% graduated from high school and 51.3% held a bachelor's degree or higher.  65.2% of the population 16 years and over was in the labor force.

2000
As of the census of 2000, there were 78,247 people, 31,521 households, and 20,898 families residing in the city. The racial makeup of the city was 86.6% Caucasian, 1.0% African American, 0.4% Native American, 4.2% Asian, 0.2% Pacific Islander, 4.7% from other races, and 3.0% from two or more races. Hispanic or Latino of any race were 11.7% of the population.

There were 31,521 households, out of which 30.7% contained children under the age of 18, 54.3% were married couples living together, 8.6% had a female householder with no husband present, and 33.7% were non-families. 24.8% of all households were made up of single individuals, and 8.2% had someone living alone who was 65 years of age or older. The mean household size was 2.46 and the mean family size was 2.96.

23.3% of residents were under the age of 18, 6.2% from 18 to 24, 31.9% from 25 to 44, 24.6% from 45 to 64, and 14.0% 65 years of age or older. The median age was 39 years. For every 100 females, there were 95.8 males. Among those 18 and older, there were 92.8 males for every 100 females.

Government

Local government 
In 2008, Carlsbad voters passed a measure to become a charter city (as opposed to the general-law municipality they had been before), approving the proposed charter by 82% and officially becoming such that same year.

Before the 2018 elections, city government was led by an elected mayor and four council members, elected at large; however, in July 2017, the city council voted to transition to district elections (except for the mayoral office, which remains an at-large position). Elections for Districts 1 and 3 were held in 2018, and in 2020, elections were held for the remaining Districts 2 and 4. As was the case before changing to district elections for the city council, city council members and the mayor are elected to 4-year terms. See the official district map here (not to scale).

Carlsbad's current mayor is Matt Hall, who has served since 2010 and was re-elected in 2018.

In May 2018, the Carlsbad city council voted 4–1 to back the federal government's lawsuit against California sanctuary state law SB 54.

The city has drafted ordinances protecting sensitive wildlife habitat, becoming one of the first municipalities in California to do so. The city has also pledged to protect about 40 percent of the city as permanent open space.

Federal and state representation

Politics
Carlsbad was a powerfully Republican stronghold during the 20th century, a classic bastion of suburban conservatism in Southern California. However, the GOP's edge in Carlsbad started to narrow in the 1990s and 2000s, with the city shifting Democratic. In 2008, Barack Obama, then the Democratic nominee for President, carried the city with a plurality. In 2012, Mitt Romney, the GOP nominee, carried the city by a 9% margin. In 2016, the city flipped back to the Democratic Party, voting for Hillary Clinton by a 10.4% margin over Donald Trump. Joe Biden expanded that margin to 17.6% over Trump in 2020.

Economy
Carlsbad's core industries include information technology, video game development, manufacturing, robotics, medical devices, life science, wireless technology, clean technology, action sports, tourism, design development and real estate. In 2013, Google named Carlsbad the digital capital of California with the strongest online business community.

Carlsbad is also known as the "Titanium Valley" because of its golf manufacturing industry. Callaway Golf Company, TaylorMade-adidas Golf Company, Cobra Golf, Titleist, and Odyssey Golf are all located in Carlsbad.

Top employers
According to 2021 figures, the top employers in the city are:

Notable corporate headquarters

 Applied Spectral Imaging, multinational bioimaging technology company
 Aptera Motors, solar electric vehicle manufacturing
 Arkeia Software, network backup solutions
 Atticus Clothing, Apparel
 Business.com, online B2B marketing platform
 Callaway Golf Company, Golf equipment and apparel manufacturer
 Clear-Com, owned by HME; an electronics manufacturer of intercom systems
 Cobra Golf, Golf equipment and apparel manufacturer
 Fallen Footwear, Shoe company
 Gemological Institute of America, Gem Nonprofit
 Hay House, New Age Publisher
 Hot Dog on a Stick, Restaurants
 Islands Fine Burgers & Drinks, restaurant
 Jazzercise, International dance fitness program
 Jenny Craig, Inc., Weight management
 Kisco Senior Living, senior living
 Macbeth Footwear, apparel
 MaxLinear, Semiconductors
 No Fear, Apparel
 Osiris Shoes, Shoe company
 PC Power & Cooling, PC power supply manufacturer
 Rockstar San Diego, Video Game Developer
 Rubio's Coastal Grill, Quick-serve Restaurants
 TaylorMade Golf Company, Golf equipment and apparel manufacturer
 Upper Deck, Sports and entertainment trading card manufacturer
 ViaSat, Satellite communications

Schools
School Districts
 Carlsbad Unified School District
 Encinitas Union School District-for Elementary schools South of Carlsbad 
 San Dieguito Union High School District-for Junior High and High schools in South Carlsbad
 San Marcos Unified School District-for schools in southeast Carlsbad

Public High
 Carlsbad High School
 La Costa Canyon High School
 Sage Creek High School

Public Intermediate
 Aviara Oaks Middle School
 Calavera Hills Middle School
 Valley Middle School

Public Interlevel
 Carlsbad Seaside Academy (Independent Study)

Public Elementary

 Aviara Oaks Elementary School
 Buena Vista Elementary School
 Calavera Hills Elementary School
 Carlsbad Seaside Academy (K-6 Alternative Education)
 El Camino Creek Elementary School
 Hope Elementary School
 Jefferson Elementary School
 Kelly Elementary School
 La Costa Heights Elementary School
 La Costa Meadows Elementary School
 Magnolia Elementary School
 Pacific Rim Elementary School
 Poinsettia Elementary School
 Mission Estancia Elementary School
 Olivenhain Pioneer Elementary School
 Rancho Carillo Elementary School

Private Schools
 Army and Navy Academy: College Prep Middle and High School
 Carlsbad Christian Academy
 Montessori Arts and Sciences School
 Pacific Ridge School
 Palisades Point Christian Academy
 St. Patrick School
 The Academy by the Sea: Camp Pacific
Nautical Oceanside Achievement School

Public libraries
 Carlsbad City Library (three branches)

Sister cities

Carlsbad's sister cities are:
 Futtsu, Chiba, Japan
 Karlovy Vary, Karlovy Vary Region,  Czech Republic

Attractions
Amusement Parks
 Legoland California

Aquariums
 Sea Life Aquarium at Legoland California

Beaches
 Carlsbad State Beach
 South Carlsbad State Beach

Campgrounds
 South Carlsbad State Beach

Golf
 Aviara Golf Club and The Aviara Golf Academy. 
La Costa Resort and Spa 
 The Crossings at Carlsbad.  
 Rancho Carlsbad Golf Club

Open Space
 Agua Hedionda Lagoon
 Batiquitos Lagoon
 Buena Vista Lagoon
 Lake Calavera Nature Preserve
Rancho La Costa Preserve

Museums
 Carlsbad Historical Society Museum
 Museum of Making Music
 Miniature Engineering Craftsmanship Museum

Gardens
 The Flower Fields

Transportation 
North County Transit District (NCTD) provides public transportation services in Carlsbad, managing Coaster commuter rail (with stops at Carlsbad Village station and Carlsbad Poinsettia station), Breeze bus service, Flex on-demand transit service, and Lift paratransit service. Sprinter hybrid rail, also managed by NCTD, does not pass through Carlsbad. While it passes through Carlsbad, the Amtrak Pacific Surfliner does not stop within the city.

Interstate 5 runs through the western part of Carlsbad, while California State Route 78 passes close to its northern border.

Notable people

 Frank Alesia, character actor and television director
 Marcus Allen, college and professional football star
 Brian P. Bilbray, U.S. Congressman
 Ron Blair, bassist for Tom Petty and the Heartbreakers
 David M. Brahms, Marine Corps  Brigadier General, Military Lawyer
 Adam Brody, film and television actor; played Seth Cohen on The O.C.
 Francesca Capaldi, child actress
 Ron Capps, Current NHRa Funny Car Driver Former Top Fuel Driver 2016 NHRA Funny Car Champion
 Leo Carrillo, actor, cartoonist, conservationist and preservationist, and owner of Leo Carrillo Ranch in Carlsbad
 Aaron Chang, surf and ocean photographer
 Brandon Chillar, linebacker for the Green Bay Packers
 Jim Cochran, pioneering organic strawberry farmer
 Jonathan Compas, center for Tampa Bay Buccaneers
 S.E. Cupp, journalist and political commentator
 David Díaz, Caldecott-winning illustrator/author
 Thomas Eshelman (CHS Grad 2012), MLB Pitcher for Baltimore Orioles
 Drew Ferris (born 1992), football player for the Tampa Bay Buccaneers of the National Football League
 Jon Foreman, lead singer of alternative band Switchfoot
 Tim Foreman, brother of Jon Foreman and bassist for Switchfoot
 Robert C. Frazee, businessman and politician
 John A. Frazier, city founder 
 Ryan Gallant, professional skateboarder
 Sid Gillman, professional football player
 Troy Glaus, baseball player
 LeRoy Grannis, photographer
 Ryan Guy, football player for St. Patrick's Athletic
 Tony Hawk, professional skateboarder and entrepreneur
 Taylor Knox, professional surfer
 Ted Johnson, professional football player
 Michellie Jones, triathlete, 2006 Ironman world champion, 2000 Olympic silver medalist
 Josh Kalis, professional skateboarder
 Rod Laver, former world #1 Australian tennis player, retired in La Costa
 Fred Lynn, baseball player
 Sal Masekela, son of musician Hugh Masekela. CHS graduate. TV host for Winter X Games on ESPN
 Tim Miller, an original student of Ashtanga-yoga founder, K.P. Jois, and teacher of Ashtanga in the US.
 Martin Milner, television actor, Route 66 and Adam-12
 Dale D. Myers, former Deputy Administrator of NASA, three NASA Distinguished Service Medals
 Gregory R Nelson Sr., co-founder of DonJoy, Inc., CEO of United Orthopedic Group
 Emily O'Brien, The Young and the Restless actress; 2003 graduate CHS
 Ron Packard, U.S. Congressman
 Kevin Pearce, snowboarder, public speaker and advocate for traumatic brain injury and Down syndrome research and education; extreme sport commentator
 Jean Peters, actress and wife of Howard Hughes
 John Pugsley, libertarian political activist
 Bridget Regan, actress known for her role as Kahlan Amnell on Legend of the Seeker
 Allard Roen, co-founder and the on-site Manager of the La Costa Resort and Spa in Carlsbad, California.
 Gene Roddenberry, creator of Star Trek 
 Kerry Rossall, stuntman, actor and producer
 Boris Said, NASCAR Sprint Cup Series driver
 Steve Scott, champion miler
 Pancho Segura, former professional tennis player and coach
 Brian Simo, NASCAR Nationwide Series driver
 Sebastian Soto, professional soccer player for SC Telstar and the United States national team
 Staciana Stitts, 2000 Summer Olympics gold medalist swimmer; graduate CHS
 Brett Swain, professional football player.
 Joe Toledo, American football player
 Victor Villaseñor, author
 Barbara Werle, actress and dancer
 Shaun White, professional snowboarder, skateboarder, 2006, 2010 and 2018 Winter Olympics gold medalist

See also

References

External links

 
 Carlsbad Chamber of Commerce
 Carlsbad Historical Society

 
Cities in San Diego County, California
North County (San Diego County)
Populated coastal places in California
San Diego metropolitan area
Incorporated cities and towns in California
Populated places established in 1952
1952 establishments in California